Grand'Place is a shopping center in the city of Grenoble, France.

History
It was built in 1975, It comprises Grand'Place and the Carrefour hypermarket.

It has been managed by Corio since 2000. It was refurbished in 2001.

References

Buildings and structures in Grenoble
Shopping malls established in 1975
1975 establishments in France
Shopping centres in France
Tourist attractions in Grenoble